Fly Perú is a Peruvian airline.

History 
Fly Perú received its Air Operator Certificate from the Peruvian Government in May 2021. The airline is expected to start operations in late 2022 or after. It is expected to fly through all of Perus provinces.

References

Airlines of Peru
Airlines established in 2021
2021 establishments in Peru